Leskovec-Dresden Bible or Dresden Bible (Bible leskovecko-drážďanská or Bible drážďanská) was the oldest known manuscript with the complete Bible translation from Latin into Czech language, and the oldest complete Bible in any Slavic language.

The bible was written approximately within the period of 1365–1375 (though this date might not be correct since Holy Roman Emperor stationed in Prague during this time, Charles IV, forbade translating Scripture). It was destroyed by fire in Leuven (where it had been sent to be photocopied) in 1914. One third of the text survived in black and white photographs and copies.

Bibliography 
 Hans Rothe, Vladimír Kyas, Friedrich Scholz (eds.): Die alttschechische Dresdener Bibel. (Facsimile aufgrund der photographischen Aufnahmen von 1914 nach dem verbrannten Original aus dem 14. Jahrhundert.) Padeborn 1993.
 Jakub Sichálek: European Background: Czech Translations. In: Elizabeth Solopova (ed.): The Wycliffite Bible. Origin, History and Interpretation. Leiden & Boston, 2017, p. 66-84

See also 
 Bible translations into Czech
 Prague Bible
 Bible of Kralice

14th-century books
Illuminated biblical manuscripts
Slavic manuscripts
14th-century Christian texts
Czech books